Parliamentary elections were held in Transkei in September 1986. The Transkei National Independence Party  won 57 of the 75 elected seats.

Results

References

Transkei
Elections in Transkei
September 1986 events in Africa